The Jacksonville Advocate was a weekly newspaper for African Americans in Jacksonville, Florida established in 1891.

It was succeeded by The Jacksonville Advocate-Free Press from 1987 to 1990 and the Jacksonville Free Press.

The University of Florida has a May 30, 1896 edition in its collection posted online.

Ike Williams III served as an editor of the paper.

A Ku Klux Klan member invoked the 5th Amendment but evidence showed he was involved in the bombing of Donal Godfrey's home, a child who had enrolled in the previously all-white Lackawanna Elementary School, and worked to defeat congressman Charles E. Bennett who he sought to replace with a "real white man". Bennett wrote a column that ran in the Advocate.

See also
List of African-American newspapers in Florida

References

Mass media in Jacksonville, Florida
African-American history in Jacksonville, Florida
Defunct newspapers published in Florida
Defunct African-American newspapers
Newspapers established in 1891
1891 establishments in Florida
1987 disestablishments in Florida
Publications disestablished in 1987